Harlem Shuffle is a 2021 novel by American novelist Colson Whitehead. It is the follow-up to Whitehead's 2019 novel The Nickel Boys, which earned him his second Pulitzer Prize for Fiction. It is a work of crime fiction and a family saga that takes place in Harlem between 1959 and 1964. It was published by Doubleday on September 14, 2021.

A sequel titled Crook Manifesto will be published in July 2023.

Synopsis 
In 1959, Ray Carney lives in Harlem with his wife Elizabeth, with whom he is expecting a second child. Although descending from a criminal family, Ray makes his living working as an upstanding furniture salesman on 125th Street. However, he occasionally fences stolen goods through his furniture store, including those from his cousin Freddie. Whereas Ray has steered his way toward an honest living, Freddie is descending into Harlem's criminal underworld. Freddie orchestrates a robbery of the Hotel Theresa with his associates and volunteers Ray to fence what is stolen. The heist goes wrong and a cast of criminal figures enter Ray's life, forcing him into a personal struggle between aspects of his fractured self. The novel is divided in three parts and covers three separate capers, set in 1959, 1961 and 1964. It culminates with the Harlem riot of 1964.

Background 
Harlem Shuffle, Whitehead's eighth novel, was conceived and begun before he wrote The Nickel Boys (2019). Whitehead spent years writing the novel, and ultimately finished it in "bite-sized chunks" during the months he spent in quarantine during the COVID-19 pandemic in New York City. Harlem Shuffle was published by Doubleday on September 14, 2021.

Reception 
The novel debuted at number three on The New York Times fiction best-seller list for the week ending September 18, 2021.

In its starred review, Kirkus Reviews called it "as audacious, ingenious, and spellbinding as any of his previous period pieces" and praised the novel's "Dickensian array of colorful, idiosyncratic characters" and Whitehead's "densely layered, intricately woven rendering of New York City in the Kennedy era." Publishers Weekly, in its starred review, praised its "superlative story" and Whitehead's depiction of an early 1960s Harlem "which lands as detailed and vivid as Joyce's Dublin."

The novel was a finalist for the 2021 Kirkus Prize for Fiction. Former United States President Barack Obama named Harlem Shuffle one of his favorite books of 2021.

References 

2021 American novels
American crime novels
Historical crime novels
Novels by Colson Whitehead
Doubleday (publisher) books
Novels set in Manhattan
Harlem in fiction
Heist fiction
Fiction set in 1959
Fiction set in 1961
Fiction set in 1964
Novels set in the 1950s
Novels set in the 1960s